Henrique Raul Campora Carmo (6 July 1945 – 7 September 2010) was an Uruguayan professional footballer who played as a midfielder between 1965 and 1979. He started his career in Uruguay with Club Nacional, and spent time in Brazil with Sport Recife, before moving to Portugal and playing in the Portuguese leagues with Barreirense and Vitória de Setúbal.

Career
Campora spent his early career with Nacional, Sport Recife and Barreirense.

Campora signed to Vitória de Setúbal in 1972 when the club finished second in the Primeira Liga. He then helped the club reach the quarter-finals of the UEFA Cup in the 1972–73 season scoring a goal against Tottenham Hotspur when the won their final game 2–1; the club were knocked out on away goals.

He finished his career at Barreirense.

After football Campora worked in civil construction before he died on 7 September 2010.

References

Club Nacional de Football players
Sport Club do Recife players
F.C. Barreirense players
Vitória F.C. players
Association football midfielders
Uruguayan expatriate footballers
Uruguayan expatriates in Brazil
Expatriate footballers in Brazil
Uruguayan expatriates in Portugal
Expatriate footballers in Portugal
1945 births
2010 deaths
Uruguayan footballers
Primeira Liga players
Uruguayan expatriate sportspeople in Portugal
Uruguayan expatriate sportspeople in Brazil